Panta also promoted as Naa Panta Kano, is a 2017 Indian Kannada-language heist thriller film directed and scored music by S. Narayan. It features Anup Revanna and newcomer Ritiksha in the lead. The story is written by Amid and the cinematography is by Mathew Rajan. The film is a remake of Tamil film Rajathandhiram (2015).

The project officially took off on 9 June 2016 and was launched by the Chief Minister Siddaramaiah in Bangalore. The film was released on 23 June 2017.

Cast
 Anup Revanna as Arjun
 Ritiksha
 Ravi Kale 
 Kari Subbu
 Irfan
 MLA Srinivasa Murthy
 Gaddappa in a special appearance
 Century Gowda in a special appearance

Soundtrack

The film's score and the soundtrack were composed by S. Narayan. Actor Sudeepa has recorded his voice for one of the songs. Initially planned to have only two songs, as a last minute addition, an item song was included in the track list and delayed the film release.

References

External links
 
 Preview

2017 films
2010s Kannada-language films
2010s thriller films
2010s heist films
Indian heist films
Indian thriller films
Films directed by S. Narayan
Kannada remakes of Tamil films